The Kluang railway station is a Malaysian train station located at and named after the town of Kluang, Kluang District, Johor. The station is located in the heart of Kluang town and access to every location in town can be done by walking distance.

The Kluang railway station provides KTM Intercity train services. There is a well known coffee shop in the station named Kluang RailCoffee. This coffee shop has become famous nationwide for its coffee drinks and its charcoal-grilled toast, a toasted sandwich made with butter and an egg, with a jam spread called "Kaya". On 3 August 2022, the coffee shop received Malaysia Book of Records (MBOR) recognition as the Oldest Railway Coffee Shop in Malaysia.

Since late-2021, passenger operations were shifted to Kluang Temporary Railway Station which is a makeshift platform constructed on a viaduct just south of the future Kluang Station. Because of this, the old Kluang Station is still open only for passenger facilities which includes the Kluang RailCoffee with track removal around old Kluang Station only commenced in December 2021. A new railway station is being built in Kampung Masjid Lama, the old station will remain as a heritage building.

See also
 Rail transport in Malaysia

References

External links
 Kluang KTM Railway Station

Kluang District
KTM ETS railway stations
Railway stations in Johor